Paul Wiggins may refer to:

 Paul Wiggins (American football) (born 1973), American football player
 Paul Wiggins (athlete) (born 1962), Australian wheelchair racer